Dave's Hot Chicken is an American fast casual restaurant chain specializing in Nashville-style hot chicken. 

Founded in Los Angeles, California with a single restaurant in 2017, the chain has expanded to over 100 locations in 4 countries in 2022 and has been named "America's fastest-growing restaurant." 

Dave's Hot Chicken is headquartered in Pasadena, California.

History

Early history 

The first Dave's Hot Chicken was opened in May 2017 by friends Dave Kopushyan, Arman Oganeshyan, Tommy Rubenyan and Gary Rubenyan. Kopushyan – the chain's namesake – was a professional chef trained by restaurateur Thomas Keller at his Napa Valley restaurant The French Laundry. Drawing from this experience, Kopushyan developed the chain's signature hot chicken recipe.  

The original location consisted of nothing more than a small street food stand with a portable fryer and a few picnic tables, and was located in a parking lot in the East Hollywood neighborhood of Los Angeles. Initially the stand sold only one item: a hot chicken combo plate.  

Following a feature on the food blog Eater Los Angeles the stand's popularity grew substantially, with lines that reportedly at times stretched an entire block. 

By late 2017, the stand was closed and a restaurant was opened in a nearby strip mall on Western Avenue. The restaurant's walls were decorated with street art by local-artists, a style that has become a recognizable feature of the chain.

Franchising and domestic expansion 
In fall 2019, the founders formed an agreement with an investment group including former Wetzel's Pretzels CEO and co-founder Bill Phelps as well as movie producer John Davis to franchise the restaurant. The deal made plans for more than 300 locations in the United States and Canada. The deal saw Phelps named as the chain's new CEO.

Within California 
In winter 2019, the chain opened 2nd and 3rd locations in Los Angeles' North Hollywood and Koreatown neighborhoods.

In late 2020 and early 2021 the chain expanded into Orange County with stores in Anaheim, Orange, Irvine and Tustin, with plans to open 4 more in the county by the end of the year.

In 2021, the chain expanded to the Bay Area with stores in Santa Rosa and Union City. The next year the chain added stores in Oakland, Sunnyvale and San Leandro.

Outside California 
In 2021, the chain opened upwards of 30 new locations and expanded into Colorado, Illinois, Michigan, Nevada, Ohio, Oregon, and Texas.

In 2022, the chain expanded into Wisconsin, North Carolina, Massachusetts, Florida, Kentucky, New York, Oklahoma, Arizona, Idaho, and New Jersey.

In January 2023, the chain expanded into Nebraska, opening a single store in Omaha.

International expansion 
The chain's first international location opened in Toronto, Ontario, Canada in January 2021.

In September 2022, Dave's Hot Chicken opened its first Middle Eastern location in the United Arab Emirates, in Dubai. The chain has agreements to open further stores in Qatar, Saudi Arabia, Kuwait, Bahrain and Oman.

In November 2022, Dave's Hot Chicken opened its first Qatar location, in Doha.

Notable investors 
Dave's Hot Chicken has a number of celebrity investors including rapper and actor Drake, actor Samuel L. Jackson, former First Lady of California Maria Shriver, athlete and TV personality Michael Strahan and Boston Red Sox owner Tom Werner.

Products 
The chain's menu is simple, consisting only of 4 choices of hot chicken tenders, sliders or both. 

Tenders are served on white bread, while sliders are served on buns with pickles, house-made "kale slaw" and a chipotle mayo sauce known as Dave's Sauce. 

Customers are offered the choice of 7 different spice levels for their chicken, ranging from "no spice" to "reaper" (which requires the customer to sign a waiver). 

Sides include french fries, cheese fries, mac & cheese and "kale slaw." The chain also offers vanilla, chocolate and strawberry milkshakes.

References 

Companies based in Los Angeles County, California
Fast-food chains of the United States
Fast-food poultry restaurants
Los Angeles
Privately held companies based in California
Restaurants established in 2017
2017 establishments in California
Chicken chains of the United States